Alen Győrfi is a Grand Prix motorcycle racer from Hungary. In 2018 he will race in the Alpe-Adria Superstock 600 Championship aboard a Yamaha YZF-R6.

Career statistics

Grand Prix motorcycle racing

By season

Races by year
(key) (Races in bold indicate pole position, races in italics indicate fastest lap)

References

External links
 Profile on motogp.com

1989 births
Living people
Hungarian motorcycle racers
125cc World Championship riders
250cc World Championship riders
FIM Superstock 1000 Cup riders
Supersport World Championship riders